Parorchestia is a genus of amphipods in the family Talitridae, containing the following species:
Parorchestia gowerensis Bousfield, 1967
Parorchestia ihurawao Duncan, 1994
Parorchestia kinabaluensis Shoemaker, 1935
Parorchestia lesliensis (Hurley, 1957)
Parorchestia longicornis Stephensen, 1938
Parorchestia morini Asari, 1998
Parorchestia tenuis (Dana, 1852)

References

Gammaridea
Taxa named by Thomas Roscoe Rede Stebbing